The term Serbian-Turkish War or Serbian-Ottoman War may refer to:

 Serbian-Turkish War (1371)
 Serbian-Turkish War (1389)
 Serbian-Turkish War (1804-1813)
 Serbian-Turkish War (1815)
 Serbian-Turkish War (1876-1877)
 Serbian-Turkish War (1877-1878)
 Serbian-Turkish War (1912-1913), during the First Balkan War
 Serbian-Turkish War (1914-1918), during the First World War

See also
 List of Serbian-Turkish Wars
 Serbian Uprising (disambiguation)
 Serbian-Bulgarian War (disambiguation)